Storm is an English, German, Dutch, and Scandinavian surname and may refer to:

 Avery Storm, stage name of American singer, Ralph di Stasio
 Bo Storm (born 1987), Danish footballer
 Byron Storm (1851-1933), American politician
 Dirck Storm (1630–1716), early colonial Dutch American famous for composing the history of the Dutch community at Sleepy Hollow and beginning the community's records
 Don Storm (1932–2019), American politician
 Elizabeth Storm (born 1958), American actress
 Edvard Storm (1749–1794), Norwegian poet
 Emy Storm (1925–2014), Swedish actress
 Esben Storm (1950–2011), Danish-Australian actor, screenwriter, television producer and director
 František Štorm (born 1966), Czech font designer
 Frederic Storm (1844–1935), Alsatian-born member of the U.S. House of Representatives from New York
 Frederik Storm (born 1989), Danish ice hockey player
 Gale Storm (1922–2009), American actress and singer
 Graeme Storm (born 1978), English professional golfer
 Gustav Storm (1845–1903), Norwegian historian
 Hannah Storm (born 1962), American television sports journalist
 Hans Otto Storm (1895–1941), German American writer, novelist and radio engineer
 Howard Storm (author) (born 1946), American author, best known for the book My Descent Into Death
 Howard Storm (director) (born 1939), American film, television director and actor
 James Storm (born 1977), ring name of American professional wrestler, James Allen Cox
 Jennifer Storm (born 1975), American author on alcohol and drug addiction and recovery
 Jerome Storm (1890–1958), American film director, actor and writer
 Johan Storm (1836–1920), Norwegian linguist
 Joanna Storm (born 1958), American pornographic actress
 John Storm (1760–1835), American Revolutionary War soldier
 John Brutzman Storm (1838–1901), American member of the U.S. House of Representatives from Pennsylvania
 Jonny Storm (born 1977) ring name of English professional wrestler, Jonathan Whitcombe
 J.W. Storm, ring name of American professional wrestler, Jeff Warner
 Kees Storm (born 1942), Dutch businessman
 Lance Storm (born 1969), ring name of Canadian professional wrestler, Lance Evers
 Lauren Storm (born 1987), American actress
 Lesley Storm (1898–1975), pen-name of Scottish writer Mabel Cowie
 Mandyleigh Storm, English female singer/songwriter
 Michael Storm (born 1939), American actor
 Morten Storm (born 1976), Danish former agent of the PET
 Nikola Storm (born 1994), Belgian professional footballer
 Olaf Storm (1894–1931), Danish film actor of the silent era
 Peter Storm (born 1953), birth name of Swedish actor Peter Stormare
 Rebecca Storm (born 1958), stage name of British singer and musical theatre actress, Eliazabeth Hewlett
 Rory Storm (1938–1972), English musician and vocalist
 Tempest Storm (1928–2021), stage name of American exotic dancer and motion picture actress Annie Banks
 Theodor Storm (1817–1888), German writer
 Thomas Storm (1749–1833), American politician
 Tim Storm (born 1964), ring name of American professional wrestler, Timothy Scoggins
 Toni Storm (born 1995), ring name of New Zealand Australian professional wrestler, Toni Rossall
 Torben Storm (born 1946), Danish footballer and coach
 Warren Storm (born 1937), American drummer and vocalist
 William George Storm (1826–1892), Canadian architect

Fictional 
 Major Storm, a fictional character in the G.I. Joe universe
 Johnny Storm, or the Human Torch, in the Marvel Comics Fantastic Four
 Sue Storm, or the Invisible Woman, in the Marvel Comics Fantastic Four
 Tommy Storm, protagonist of the eponymous novel by A.J. Healy
"Jackson Storm", antagonist in Cars 3

See also
Storm (given name)
Storms (surname)
Storm (disambiguation)

Surnames from nicknames
Surnames of English origin